Kavadiguda is a residential urban sprawl of Secunderabad, India.

Transport
Kavadiguda is well connected by TSRTC buses to all parts of the city.
The closest MMTS Train station is James Street.

Kavadiguda is the center of Hyderabad city which is nearby to various cities like secunderabad (major Railway hub), RTC Cross Roads (major Movie hub and famous Bawarchi Biryani), Patny (famous Paradise biryani).

References

Neighbourhoods in Hyderabad, India